Jacob Sebastian Haugaard Mernild (born 20 October 1972) is a Danish professor in climate change, glaciology and hydrology, who is the pro-vice-chancellor of the University of Southern Denmark. Mernild has been an Intergovernmental Panel on Climate Change (IPCC) author for the United Nations since 2010. Initially a contributing author on the IPCC Fifth Assessment Report, he was lead author on the IPCC Sixth Assessment Report.

Mernild is one of the world's leading climate scientists in the fields of glaciology and hydrology, specializing in the impacts of climate change in the Arctic and on the cryosphere, especially the ice sheets (glacier mass balance) and water levels. He has contributed to a number of international scientific reports, including the annual Arctic Report Card from National Oceanic and Atmospheric Administration (NOAA) and the Melting Snow and Ice: A Call for Action report, which Vice President Al Gore presented at the United Nations Climate Change Conference in Copenhagen in 2015.

Mernild has worked as a senior research scientist at the Los Alamos National Laboratory and the International Arctic Research Center at the University of Alaska Fairbanks, United States, and as research director of the Climate Change and Glaciology Laboratory at the Center for Scientific Studies in Valdivia, Chile. He has on several occasions been a visiting professor at Colorado State University, University of Colorado Boulder, New York University, Hokkaido University, and Japan Agency for Marine-Earth Science and Technology.

In 2016, he became the managing director of the 'Nansen Center' (part of Bjerknes Centre for Climate Research) in Bergen, Norway, a renowned climate research centre in Europe. He was elected pro-vice-chancellor of the University of Southern Denmark in 2020.

Early life and education 
Jacob Sebastian Haugaard Mernild was born in 1972 in Frederiksberg, Copenhagen, Denmark. He grew up in Hjallese, a suburb of Odense. He was admitted to the 'Teknikum' (College of Engineering), where he was to study engineering. Mernild soon dropped out, however, and instead became a captain in the Royal Danish Army, serving in Kosovo and the Afghan War.

After serving in the Danish army, Mernild completed a Bachelor of Science degree in high-latitude climatology and glaciology from the Department of Geology of the University of Copenhagen in 1999. In 2001, he completed a Master of Science degree in mid-latitude climatology and hydrology, also from the University of Copenhagen. Mernild obtained a PhD degree in high-latitude climatology, glaciology, and hydrology, in 2006. In June 2016, Mernild successfully defended his doctoral thesis, Water balance from mountain glacier scale to ice sheet scale with focus on Mittvakkat Glacier, Southeast Greenland and the Greenland Ice Sheet and thereby obtained a Doctor of Science degree from the Faculty of Science (University of Copenhagen).

Career 
In between his PhD degree and D.Sc. degree, he worked at the International Arctic Research Center of the University of Alaska Fairbanks, until 2009.

In 2004, and again between 2009 and 2010, he was a visiting professor at the Cooperative Institute for Research in the Atmosphere at Colorado State University, and from 2007 to 2008 (and again in 2015), he was a visiting professor at the Cooperative Institute for Research in Environmental Sciences at the University of Colorado Boulder. In 2008, he was a visiting professor at the Institute for Low Temperature Sciences at Hokkaido University, Japan. Between 2011 and 2012, he was a visiting professor at the Center for Atmospheric Ocean Science at New York University, whereafter he was a visiting professor at the Center for Sea Level Change at New York University Abu Dhabi, UAE. 

In 2016, he became a full professor at the Faculty of Engineering and Science at the Western Norway University of Applied Sciences, Sogndal, but shortly afterwards he was appointed Managing Director of the Nansen Environmental and Remote Sensing Center (NERSC) in Bergen. He was elected pro-vice-chancellor of the University of Southern Denmark in 2020. He is also the director (Program Chair) of the newly established Climate Centre of the University of Southern Denmark. Mernild is also partly a professor of climate change and glaciology at the Geophysical Institute of the University of Bergen in Norway.

Scientific research 
Mernild's scientific research focuses on local, regional and global climate modelling, using various atmospheric and terrestrial models and observations, with a particular focus on understanding and simulating climate change interactions related to snow, glacier ice mass-balance (for the Greenland Ice Sheet, Antarctic Ice Sheet, and mountain glaciers), and freshwater run-off (the water balance components) in the Arctic, Antarctic, Patagonia, and the Andes.

Mernild has also conducted extensive field research in cold and high mountain regions, leading and participating in glaciological, snow, and hydrological research expeditions throughout the Arctic and Andes.

Mernild's scientific research and findings on glaciers and climate change impacts on them, in particular, have received considerable attention in climate science forums, and the general public. Mernild's studies of Greenlandic glaciers have received particular attention because they combine different disciplines and detailed observations and modelling tools, enabling Mernild to use the glaciers to understand similar patterns elsewhere in the Arctic and around the world. Mernild did so by examining factors ranging from snow composition, glacier area and volume changes to meltwater runoff from Greenland.

In his doctoral thesis defence, Mernild correlated the analyses of the Greenland glacier with his studies of glacier, ice sheet and climate conditions in the northern North Atlantic region, to the ice sheet and to other glaciers and ice sheets on the globe.

Memberships in committees and commissions 
Mernild has been a member of a number of organizations and committees. List:

 2016-2020: Board member of Bjerknes Centre for Climate Research.
 2010-present: Member of the International Commission on Snow and Ice Hydrology (ICSIH), under International Association of Hydrological Sciences (IAHS).
 2015-2029: Vice President of the International Commission on Snow and Ice Hydrology (ICSIH), under International Association of Hydrological Sciences (IAHS).
 2014-2018: Member of the Climate and Cryosphere (CLiC) Scientific Steering Group, under the World Climate Research Programme at World Meteorological Organization, United Nations.

Awards 
In 2018, he was awarded the Danish Broadcast Corporation's prestigious dissemination award, the Rosenkjær Prize, which since 1963 has been awarded to prominent scientists and cultural figures who have succeeded in communicating complex scientific topics.

In 2002, he won the University of Copenhagen's Silver Medal for his Price Dissertation on hydrology.

Personal life 
Mernild is married to educational psychologist Birgitte Therkildsen, and together they have two children.

Selected works and publications

IPCC duties 
Mernild has been an IPCC author for the United Nations since 2010. Initially a contributing author on the IPCC Fifth Assessment Report, he was most recently lead author on the IPCC Sixth Assessment Report.

International reports 
 Lead Participant:  
 Lead author: 
 Contributing author: 
 Author: 
 Author:  
 Lead author:

Journals

References 

1972 births
Living people
Academic staff of the University of Southern Denmark
Academic staff of the University of Bergen
Glaciologists
Hydrologists
Danish climatologists
University of Copenhagen alumni
People from Odense
Intergovernmental Panel on Climate Change lead authors
Intergovernmental Panel on Climate Change contributing authors
Danish scientists